Chekiang First Bank was a bank in Hong Kong incorporated in 1950 by Li Ming. It is now merged to Wing Hang Bank. At the time of the merger with Wing Hang, Chekiang First Bank had 17 branches in Hong Kong, a wholly owned subsidiary in Luxembourg, an agency in San Francisco, and a representative office in Shanghai. As of 31 December 2002, Chekiang First had total assets of HK$27.8 billion. Wing Hang subsequent re-branded all services under the Wing Hang brand.

History 
1907: Founded under the name Chekiang Provincial and Industrial Bank, with headquarters in Hangzhou.
1911: Restructured as Chekiang Bank of the Republic of China.
1912: Restructured as the Chekiang Provincial and Industrial Bank.
1923: Li Ming converted the bank's Shanghai branch into the Chekiang Industrial Bank, with headquarters in Shanghai, and became its director.
1948: Restructured as Chekiang First Bank.
1950: Re-established in Hong Kong as Chekiang First Bank of Commerce.
1962: Japan's Dai-Ichi Kangyo Bank (now the Mizuho Corporate Bank), acquired a 30% stake in the bank, a stake that eventually it increased to 95%.
2003: Acquired by Wing Hang Bank.
2004: Merged to Wing Hang Bank.

References 

 

 

Banks established in 1907
Defunct banks of China
Companies based in Zhejiang
Banks based in Shanghai
Defunct banks of Hong Kong
Banks disestablished in 2004
Chinese companies established in 1907